"Time" is a song by the English progressive rock band Pink Floyd. It is included as the fourth track on their eighth album The Dark Side of the Moon (1973) and was released as a single in the United States. Bassist Roger Waters wrote the lyrics. Keyboardist Richard Wright shares lead vocals (his last until "Wearing the Inside Out" on The Division Bell) alongside guitarist David Gilmour.

The lyrics deal with the passage of time. Waters got the idea when he realised he was no longer preparing for anything in life, but was right in the middle of it. He has described this realisation taking place at ages 28 and 29 in various interviews. It is noted for its long introductory passage of clocks chiming and alarms ringing. The sounds were recorded in an antique store made as a quadrophonic test by engineer Alan Parsons, not specifically for the album.

The album track also includes a reprise of the song "Breathe". It is the only song on the album to credit all four principal members for songwriting, and the last to do so in the band's discography.

Composition
"Time" is in the key of F♯ minor. Each clock at the beginning of the song was recorded separately in an antiques store. These clock sounds are followed by a two-minute passage dominated by Nick Mason's drum solo, with rototoms and backgrounded by a tick-tock sound created by Roger Waters picking two muted strings on his bass. With David Gilmour singing lead on the verses and with Richard Wright singing lead on the bridges and with female singers and Gilmour providing backup vocals, the song's lyrics deal with Roger Waters' realization that life was not about preparing yourself for what happens next, but about grabbing control of your own destiny.

According to an interview by Phil Taylor in 1994, David Gilmour had been using a Lexicon PCM-70 to store the circular delay sounds heard in "Time", which could duplicate the kind of echo he used to get from his old Binson echo unit.

The verse chords cycle through F♯ minor, A major, E major, and F♯ minor again. During this section, Gilmour's guitar and Wright's keyboards are panned to the extreme right and left of the stereo spectrum, respectively. Gilmour sings lead during this section.

The bridge section, with Wright singing lead, has a notably "thicker" texture, with the female backing vocalists singing multi-tracked "oohs" and "aahs" throughout, and Gilmour singing harmony with Wright in the second half. The chords of this section are D major seventh to A major ninth, which is repeated. The D major seventh, with the notes of D, F♯, A, and C♯, can be heard as an F♯ minor chord with a D in the bass, fitting the song's overall key. The second half progresses from D major seventh to C♯ minor, then B minor to E major.

The first bridge leads to a guitar solo by Gilmour, which plays over the verse and bridge progressions. The solo is followed by another verse sung by Gilmour. When the bridge is repeated, it does not conclude on E major as before. Instead, the B minor leads to an F major chord, while Waters's bass stays on B, resulting in an unusual dissonance as a transition to the key of E minor for "Breathe (Reprise)".

Pink Floyd performed the song live from 1972 to 1975, and after the departure of Waters, from 1987 to 1994. Waters began performing the song in his solo concerts, singing the verses himself, beginning in 1999 with In the Flesh and again with The Dark Side of the Moon Live from 2006 to 2008 (occasionally featuring guest appearances from Nick Mason) and the Us + Them Tour from 2017 to 2018. Gilmour has performed the song live on every one of his solo tours since Pink Floyd's Pulse tour, with the late Richard Wright sharing vocals until his death.

Reception
In a contemporary review for The Dark Side of the Moon, Loyd Grossman of Rolling Stone gave "Time" a positive review, describing the track as "a fine country-tinged rocker with a powerful guitar solo by David Gilmour".

Film
During live performances, the band back-projected a specially-commissioned, animated film by Ian Emes. The film was subsequently included as an extra on the Pulse DVD.

Personnel
 David Gilmour – electric guitars, lead (verses and "Breathe (Reprise)") and backing vocals (bridges and "Breathe (Reprise)")
 Richard Wright – Farfisa organ, Wurlitzer electronic piano, EMS VCS 3, co-lead vocals (bridges)
 Roger Waters – bass guitar, EMS VCS 3
 Nick Mason – drums, rototoms

with:

 Doris Troy – backing vocals
 Lesley Duncan – backing vocals
 Liza Strike – backing vocals
 Barry St. John – backing vocals

Live versions
 Live versions of the song are on the Pink Floyd albums Delicate Sound of Thunder and Pulse. The Delicate Sound Of Thunder version does not feature the reprise of "Breathe".
 A Roger Waters solo version is on the album In the Flesh: Live, sung by Waters, Doyle Bramhall II and Jon Carin.
 Live versions with Richard Wright appear on the David Gilmour solo Remember That Night DVD and Live in Gdańsk album.

In popular culture

Television, films and video games
"Time" was used in the opening of the Marvel Cinematic Universe film Eternals.

Certifications

References

External links

1973 songs
1974 singles
Harvest Records singles
Pink Floyd songs
Songs about death
Songs about old age
Songs written by David Gilmour
Songs written by Nick Mason
Songs written by Richard Wright (musician)
Songs written by Roger Waters
Song recordings produced by David Gilmour
Song recordings produced by Roger Waters
Song recordings produced by Richard Wright (musician)
Song recordings produced by Nick Mason